Neri Corsini, Nerio Corsini or Neri Corsini the Elder (to distinguish himself from Neri Maria Corsini) (Florence, 1614 – Florence, 6 December 1678) was an Italian cardinal from the noble Corsini family.

Biography
He was the son of Filippo Corsini and Maddalena Machiavelli. He was the uncle of pope Clement XII and great uncle of cardinal Andrea Corsini. 

A cleric of the Camera Apostolica under pope Innocent X, he became Tesoriere in 1660. He was made a cardinal presbyter in the 14 January 1664 consistory and two months later given the titulus of Santi Nereo e Achilleo. From 1672 to 1677 he was put in charge of the diocese of Arezzo as a personal titular of the archbishop. He also took part in the 1667, 1669–70 and 1676 papal conclaves. His remains are buried in the Corsini Chapel in Santa Maria del Carmine.

Sources

 

1614 births
1678 deaths
17th-century Italian cardinals
Neri
17th-century Roman Catholic bishops in Genoa